The Consensus 1983 College Basketball All-American team, as determined by aggregating the results of four major All-American teams.  To earn "consensus" status, a player must win honors from a majority of the following teams: the Associated Press, the USBWA, The United Press International and the National Association of Basketball Coaches.

1983 Consensus All-America team

Individual All-America teams

AP Honorable Mention:

Michael Adams, Boston College
Billy Allen, Nevada
Paul Anderson, Dartmouth
Charles Barkley, Auburn
Thurl Bailey, NC State
Joe Binion, North Carolina A&T
Charlie Bradley, South Florida
Adrian Branch, Maryland
Randy Breuer, Minnesota
Darrell Browder, TCU
Michael Brown, Penn
Darren Burnett, Columbia
Steve Burtt, Iona
Michael Cage, San Diego State
Tony Campbell, Ohio State
Howard Carter, LSU
Terry Catledge, South Alabama
Roosevelt Chapman, Dayton
Carlos Clark, Ole Miss
Matt Clark, Oklahoma State
Ben Coleman, Maryland
Leroy Combs, Oklahoma State
Tony Costner, Saint Joseph's
Phil Cox, Vanderbilt
Jeff Cross, Maine
Russell Cross, Purdue
Pete DeBisschop, Fairfield
John Devereaux, Ohio
Tim Dillon, Northern Illinois
Robin Dixon, New Hampshire
Calvin Duncan, VCU
Devin Durrant, BYU
Vern Fleming, Georgia
Rod Foster, UCLA
John Garris, Boston College
Michael Gerren, South Alabama
Franklin Giles, South Carolina St.
Billy Goodwin, St. John's
Greg Goorjian, Loyola Marymount
Stewart Granger, Villanova
Greg Grant, Utah State
Butch Graves, Yale
A. C. Green, Oregon State
Glen Green, Murray State
Sidney Green, UNLV
Steve Harriel, Washington State
Steve Harris, Tulsa
Marvin Haynes, South Carolina St.
Carl Henry, Kansas
Jacque Hill, USC
Roy Hinson, Rutgers
Dave Hoppen, Nebraska
Alfredrick Hughes, Loyola (IL)
Jay Humphries, Colorado
Mike Jackson, Wyoming
Joe Jakubick, Akron
David Jenkins, Bowling Green
Dwight Jones, Cincinnati
Greg Jones, West Virginia
Keith Jones, Stanford
Mark Jones, St. Bonaventure
Brian Kellerman, Idaho
Earl Kelley, Connecticut
Harry Kelly, Texas Southern
Ted Kitchel, Indiana
Rick Lamb, Illinois State
Mike Lang, Penn State
David Little, Oklahoma
Sidney Lowe, NC State
Kenneth Lyons, North Texas State
Jeff Malone, Mississippi State
Pace Mannion, Utah
Ray McCallum, Ball State
Rodney McCray, Louisville
Xavier McDaniel, Wichita State
Chris McNealy, San Jose State
Larry Micheaux, Houston
Chris Mullin, St. John's
Jay Murphy, Boston College
Mark Nickens, American
Akeem Olajuwon, Houston
Horace Owens, Rhode Island
Ernest Patterson, New Mexico St.
John Paxson, Notre Dame
Bernard Perry, Howard
Mark Petteway, New Orleans
Orlando Phillips, Pepperdine
Ed Pinckney, Villanova
Derrick Pope, Montana
Mark Price, Georgia Tech
Blair Rasmussen, Oregon
Leo Rautins, Syracuse
Glenn Rivers, Marquette
Craig Robinson, Princeton
Dan Ruland, James Madison
David Russell, St. John's
Erich Santifer, Syracuse
Byron Scott, Arizona State
Brad Sellers, Wisconsin
Rick Simmons, Air Force
Tony Simms, Boston University
Charlie Sitton, Oregon State
Jarvis Smith, Bethune-Cookman
Steve Smith, Marist
Barry Stevens, Iowa State
Greg Stokes, Iowa
Jon Sundvold, Missouri
Dane Suttle, Pepperdine
Peter Thibeaux, Saint Mary's
Paul Thompson, Tulane
Otis Thorpe, Providence
Eric Turner, Michigan
Melvin Turpin, Kentucky
Clyde Vaughan, Pittsburgh
Sam Vincent, Michigan State
Byron Walker, UTEP
Graylin Warner, Southwestern Louisiana
Tony Webster, Hawaii
Mark West, Old Dominion
Mitchell Wiggins, Florida State
Paul Williams, Arizona State
Ronnie Williams, Florida
Othell Wilson, Virginia
Randy Wittman, Indiana
Leon Wood, Cal State Fullerton
Carlos Yates, George Mason
Danny Young, Wake Forest
Michael Young, Houston

Academic All-Americans
On March 7, 1983 CoSIDA announced the 1983 Academic All-America team.

References

NCAA Men's Basketball All-Americans
All-Americans